or  (Spanish: marinade, sauce, or seasoning) is the immersion of cooked food in a stock (or sauce) composed variously of paprika, oregano, salt, garlic, and vinegar to preserve and enhance its flavor. The practice, native to Iberia (Spanish cuisine and Portuguese cuisine), was widely adopted in Latin America, as well as Spanish and Portuguese colonies in Africa and Asia.

In the Philippines, the name  was given by colonial-era Spaniards on the islands to a different indigenous cooking method that also uses vinegar. Although similar, this developed independently of Spanish influence.

Characteristics 
In the years following the arrival of Europeans to the Americas, meat and fish began to be preserved by new methods. Low temperatures facilitate food preservation, but in higher temperatures, other techniques, such as adobo, became necessary. Animals were usually slaughtered in the coldest months of winter, but surplus meat had to be preserved in the warmer months. This was facilitated through the use of adobos (marinades) along with paprika (a substance that may have antimicrobial properties due to the capsaicin content). Paprika gives a reddish color to adobos, and the capsaicins in paprika dissolve in fats, allowing its penetration beyond the tissue surface.

Applications 
Adobo was employed initially as a method of food preservation, but in time—with the advent of refrigeration methods—it came to be used primarily as a method of flavoring foods before cooking. Traditional preparations were created with the intent of flavoring, such as cazón en adobo (dogfish in adobo, made from school shark and originating from Cadiz, a city in the Cádiz province of Spain); berenjenas de Almagro (Almagro aubergine, a pickled aubergine characteristic of "Manchega" cuisine from the Castile-La Mancha region of Spain, specifically from Almagro, a city in the Ciudad Real province of Spain); and lomo en adobo (tenderloin of beef or pork in adobo).

Variations 
The noun form of adobo describes a marinade or seasoning mix. Recipes vary widely by region: Puerto Rican adobo, a rub used principally on meats, differs greatly from the Mexican variety.  Meat marinated or seasoned with an adobo is referred to as adobado or adobada.

Mexico 

In Mexico adobo refers to a condiment or cooking sauce with a base containing chillies, particularly Chipotle and Ancho peppers. An Ancho pepper is a Poblano chili that is dried after it turns red. These sauces are used as a marinade and to add a smoky, spicy flavor.

Chipotles en adobo 

Adobo relates to marinated dishes such as chipotles en adobo in which chipotles (smoked ripe jalapeño peppers) are stewed in a sauce with tomatoes, garlic, vinegar, salt, and spices. The spices vary, but generally include several types of peppers (in addition to the chipotle and most likely those on hand), ground cumin and dried oregano.  Some recipes include orange juice and lemon or lime juices.  They often include a pinch of brown sugar just to offset any bitter taste.

Puerto Rico
Puerto Rican-style adobo is a seasoned salt that is generously sprinkled or rubbed on meats and seafood prior to grilling, sautéing, or frying. Supermarkets sell prepared blends. There are two types of adobo on the island. The wet rub, adobo mojado, consists of crushed garlic, olive oil, salt, black pepper, dry or fresh orégano brujo, citrus juice or vinegar or a mix of both citrus and vinegar. More widely used on the island is a dry mix, adobo seco. It is easier to prepare and has a long shelf life. Adobo seco consists of garlic powder, onion powder, salt, black pepper, dry orégano brujo, and sometimes dried citrus zest.

Peru
Adobo is a typical dish of Peruvian cuisine, specifically in the area of Arequipa. This is a dish of pork marinated in spices and vegetables, which are cooked in a clay pot until it becomes tender. Bread is served alongside for dipping in the sauce.

Philippines

In Filipino cuisine, adobo refers to a common cooking process indigenous to the Philippines. When the Spanish first explored the Philippines in the late 16th century, they encountered a cooking process that involved stewing with vinegar. The Spanish referred to it as adobo due to its superficial similarity to the Spanish adobo. The Filipino adobo is an entirely separate method of preparing food and is distinct from the Spanish marinade.

Unlike the Spanish and Latin American adobo, the main ingredients of Philippine adobo are ingredients native to Southeast Asia, namely vinegar, soy sauce or patis (fish sauce), black peppercorns, and bay leaves. It does not traditionally use chilis, paprika, oregano, or tomatoes. There are other noted versions of Philippine adobo, namely Adobong Puti (White Adobo, prepared with salt instead of soy sauce) and Adobong Tuyo (Dry Adobo).

The dish is normally cooked with pork or chicken and sometimes with only vegetables like kangkong (water spinach) or sitaw (green beans).

Its only similarity to Spanish and Latin American adobo is the primary use of vinegar and garlic. Philippine adobo has a characteristically salty and sour (and often sweet) taste, in contrast to Spanish and Mexican adobos which are spicier or infused with oregano.

Uruguay 
In Uruguay, adobo is a spice mix of the same spices of the Spanish marinade. Also adobar is the act of using this mix as a condiment. A sauce made of adobo, salt and water is called mojo.

History

One of the earliest references to adobo is found in the Manual del Cocinero, Repostero, Pastelero, Confitero Y Botillero by Mariano de Rementeria y Fica in 1850.

See Also
Daube (French culinary equivalent)

References

External links 
 
 

Chili pepper dishes
Cuisine of the Southwestern United States
Hawaiian cuisine
Marinades
Mexican cuisine
Peruvian cuisine
Philippine cuisine
Puerto Rican cuisine
Spanish cuisine
Guamanian cuisine
Spices